Carl Gustav "Peter" Hempel (January 8, 1905 – November 9, 1997) was a German writer,  philosopher, logician, and epistemologist. He was a major figure in logical empiricism, a 20th-century movement in the philosophy of science. He is especially well known for his articulation of the deductive-nomological model of scientific explanation, which was considered the "standard model" of scientific explanation during the 1950s and 1960s. He is also known for the raven paradox (also known as "Hempel's paradox").

Education
Hempel studied mathematics, physics and philosophy at the University of Göttingen and subsequently at the University of Berlin and the Heidelberg University. In Göttingen, he encountered David Hilbert and was impressed by his program attempting to base all mathematics on solid logical foundations derived from a limited number of axioms.

After moving to Berlin, Hempel participated in a congress on scientific philosophy in 1929 where he met Rudolf Carnap and became involved in the Berlin Circle of philosophers associated with the Vienna Circle. In 1934, he received his doctoral degree from the University of Berlin with a dissertation on probability theory, titled  Beiträge zur logischen Analyse des Wahrscheinlichkeitsbegriffs (Contributions to the Logical Analysis of the Concept of Probability). Hans Reichenbach was Hempel's main doctoral supervisor, but after Reichenbach lost his philosophy chair in Berlin in 1933, Wolfgang Köhler and Nicolai Hartmann became the official supervisors.

Career
Within a year of completing his doctorate, the increasingly repressive and anti-semitic Nazi regime in Germany had prompted Hempel to emigrate to Belgium as his wife was of Jewish ancestry. In this he was aided by the scientist Paul Oppenheim, with whom he co-authored the book Der Typusbegriff im Lichte der neuen Logik on typology and logic in 1936. In 1937, Hempel emigrated to the United States, where he accepted a position as Carnap's assistant at the University of Chicago. He later held positions at the City College of New York (1939–1948), Yale University (1948–1955) and Princeton University, where he taught alongside Thomas Kuhn and remained until made emeritus in 1973. Between 1974 and 1976, he was an emeritus at the Hebrew University in Jerusalem before becoming University Professor of Philosophy at the University of Pittsburgh in 1977 and teaching there until 1985. In 1989 the Department of Philosophy at Princeton University renamed its Three Lecture Series the 'Carl G. Hempel Lectures' in his honor. He was an elected member of the American Academy of Arts and Sciences and of the American Philosophical Society for which he served as president.

Philosophical views
Hempel never embraced the term "logical positivism" as an accurate description of the Vienna Circle and Berlin Group, preferring to describe those philosophers, including himself, as "logical empiricists." He believed that the term "positivism," with its roots in the materialism of Auguste Comte, implied a metaphysics that empiricists were not obliged to embrace. He regarded Ludwig Wittgenstein as a philosopher with a genius for stating philosophical insights in striking and memorable language, but believed that he, or at least the Wittgenstein of the Tractatus, made claims that could only be supported by recourse to metaphysics. To Hempel, metaphysics involved claims to know things which were not knowable; that is, metaphysical hypotheses were incapable of confirmation or disconfirmation by evidence.

Hempel is also credited with the revival of the Deductive-nomological model of explanation in the 1940's with the publication of "The function of general laws in history".

Legacy
In 2005, the City of Oranienburg, Hempel's birthplace, renamed one of its streets "Carl-Gustav-Hempel-Straße" in his memory.

Bibliography

Principal works
1936: "Über den Gehalt von Wahrscheinlichkeitsaussagen" and, with Paul Oppenheim, "Der Typusbegriff im Licht der neuen Logik"
1942: "The Function of General Laws in History"
1943: "Studies in the Logic of Confirmation"
1959: "The Logic of Functional Analysis"
1965: Aspects of Scientific Explanation
1966: Philosophy of Natural Science

Essay collections
Aspects of Scientific Explanation and Other Essays (1965), .
Selected Philosophical Essays (2000), .
The Philosophy of Carl G. Hempel: Studies in Science, Explanation, and Rationality (2001), .

Articles
″On the Nature of Mathematical Truth" and ″Geometry and Empirical Science″ (1945), American Mathematical Monthly, issue 52.
Articles in Readings in Philosophical Analysis (pp. 222–249), edited by Herbert Feigl and Wilfrid Sellars (Appleton-Century-Crofts, Inc., 1949).

References

Further reading
Holt, Jim, "Positive Thinking" (review of Karl Sigmund, Exact Thinking in Demented Times:  The Vienna Circle and the Epic Quest for the Foundations of Science, Basic Books, 449 pp.), The New York Review of Books, vol. LXIV, no. 20 (21 December 2017), pp. 74–76.

External links 
 Carl Gustav Hempel at the Internet Encyclopedia of Philosophy.
 "Problems and Changes in the Empiricist Criterion of Meaning" by Carl G. Hempel
 Obituary by the Princeton University Office of Communications.
 Carl Gustav Hempel Papers, 1903-1997, ASP.1999.01 at the Archives of Scientific Philosophy, Special Collections Department, University of Pittsburgh.
 Obituary in the New York Times.

1905 births
1997 deaths
20th-century essayists
20th-century German male writers
20th-century German non-fiction writers
20th-century German philosophers
City College of New York faculty
Empiricists
German essayists
German logicians
German male essayists
German male non-fiction writers
Academic staff of the Hebrew University of Jerusalem
Heidelberg University alumni
Humboldt University of Berlin alumni
Logical positivism
People from Oranienburg
People from the Province of Brandenburg
Philosophers of logic
Philosophers of mathematics
Philosophers of science
Philosophy academics
Philosophy writers
Princeton University faculty
University of Göttingen alumni
University of Pittsburgh faculty
Vienna Circle
Yale University faculty
Corresponding Fellows of the British Academy